Hits is the greatest hits album by Canadian rock band Billy Talent released November 4, 2014 via Warner Music Canada and The End Records. The album features the band's most popular singles from their last four studio albums, with the addition of two brand new songs, "Kingdom of Zod" and "Chasing the Sun".

To promote the compilation, the opening page of the band's website was transformed into what they called a "Video Vault," a video archive. The first video was an introduction from frontman Ben Kowalewicz, explaining the idea of the vault. In the two weeks that followed, the band, starting with Try Honesty, posted the official video of one of the songs (with the exception of "Kingdom of Zod" and "Chasing The Sun," which at that point were unreleased and had no official video). Additional videos related anecdotes and explanations for that day's song from the band members themselves (who appeared in pairs; Ben and Aaron, and Ian and Jon) were also added via YouTube. One of the new songs, Kingdom of Zod was released as a single September 25. 2014 via iTunes pre-order.

Track listing

Chart performance

References

Billy Talent albums
2014 compilation albums